François Philippe (4 November 1930 – 7 November 2001) is a French footballer. He competed in the men's tournament at the 1960 Summer Olympics.

References

External links
 

1930 births
2001 deaths
French footballers
Olympic footballers of France
Footballers at the 1960 Summer Olympics
Sportspeople from Finistère
Association football defenders
Footballers from Brittany
Le Havre AC players